Aurora was launched at Whitby in 1808. She did not enter Lloyd's Register until 1814, when she became a transport operating out of Plymouth. In 1820 she carried settlers to South Africa. Thereafter she traded to the Baltic and North America. In 1830 she transferred her registry to Hull. She was last listed in 1847.

Career
Aurora first appeared in Lloyd's Register (LR) in 1814 with T. Pearson, master, Fishburn, owner, and trade Plymouth transport.

In 1820 she carried settlers to South Africa under the British government's 1820 Settlers scheme. Captain Thomas Pearson sailed from England on 15 February 1820 with 344 settlers. Aurora reached Simon's Bay on 1 May, and arrived at Algoa Bay, Algoa Bay, Port Elizabeth, on 15 May.

Fate 
Aurora was last listed in 1847 with no trade, and with stale master and ownership data.

Citations and references
Citations

References
 
  

1808 ships
Ships built in Whitby
Age of Sail merchant ships of England
Ships of the 1820 settlers